The 1984 Virginia Slims of Utah was a women's tennis tournament played on outdoor hard courts in Salt Lake City, Utah in the United States that was part of the 1984 Virginia Slims World Championship Series. The tournament was held from September 10 through September 16, 1984. Third-seeded Yvonne Vermaak won the singles title.

Finals

Singles
 Yvonne Vermaak defeated  Terry Holladay 6–1, 6–2
 It was Vermaak's 3rd title of the year and the 7th of her career.

Doubles
 Anne Minter /  Elizabeth Minter defeated  Heather Crowe /  Robin White 6–2, 7–5
 It was A. Minter's 1st career title. It was E. Minter's 1st career title.

References

External links
 ITF tournament edition details

Virginia Slims of Utah
Virginia Slims of Utah
Virginia Slims of Utah
Virginia Slims of Utah
Virginia Slims of Utah